In mathematics, the Dini–Lipschitz criterion is a sufficient condition for the Fourier series of a periodic function to converge uniformly at all real numbers. The criterion states that the Fourier series of a periodic function f converges uniformly on the real line if 

References

Fourier series
Theorems in Fourier analysis